Kuhmo Airfield is an airfield in Kuhmo, Finland, about  west of Kuhmo town centre.

See also
List of airports in Finland

References

External links
 VFR Suomi/Finland – Kuhmo Airfield
 Lentopaikat.net – Kuhmo Airfield 

Airports in Finland
Airfield